The 2005 Formula BMW World Final was the first Formula BMW World Final race held at Bahrain International Circuit on 16 December 2005.  The race was won by AM-Holzer Rennsport GmbH's driver Marco Holzer, who finished ahead Sébastien Buemi and Nico Hülkenberg.

Drivers and teams

Results

Qualifying

Group 1

Group 2

Pre-Final Race

Final Race

  Nico Hülkenberg given 10-second penalty.
  Edoardo Piscopo was excluded from race protocol.

References

Formula BMW seasons
BMW World Final
BMW World Final
BMW World Final